The 2022 South Africa Sevens was the third tournament within the 2022–23 World Rugby Sevens Series and the 22nd South Africa Sevens tournament. It was held on 9–11 December 2022 at the Cape Town Stadium in Cape Town, South Africa.

Format
The 16 teams were drawn into four pools of four. Each team plays every other team in their pool once. The top two teams from each pool advance to the Cup playoffs and compete for gold, silver and bronze medals. The other teams from each pool go to the classification playoffs for 9th to 16th placings.

Teams
Fifteen core teams participated in the tournament along with one invited team, Uganda.

Pool stage
All times in South African Standard Time (UTC+2:00)

Pool A

Pool B

Pool C

Pool C saw a huge upset with defending champions New Zealand defeated 14-10 by Spain.

Pool D

Placement matches

Thirteenth place

Ninth place

Knockout stage

Fifth place

Cup playoffs

Tournament placings

Source: World Rugby

References

2022
2022–23 World Rugby Sevens Series
2022 in South African rugby union
December 2022 sports events in Africa